Alexander Robertson (December 5, 1838 – February 29, 1888) was a lawyer and political figure in Ontario, Canada. He represented Hastings West provincially in the Legislative Assembly of Ontario from 1879 to 1882 and Hastings West federally in the House of Commons of Canada from 1882 to 1888 as a Conservative member.

He was born in Trenton, Upper Canada, the son of William Robertson, a Scottish-born lumber merchant. He was educated in Belleville, went on to study law, was called to the bar in 1864 and set up practice in Belleville. Robertson served on the Belleville town council from 1864 to 1869 and was Belleville's mayor in 1870 and from 1878 to 1879. He served as a captain in the militia during the Fenian raids. He married Mary Georgina Stewart in 1870. In 1882, he resigned his seat in the provincial assembly to run for a seat in the House of Commons. Robertson was a prominent member of the Masonic order. He died in office in 1888.

External links 

A Cyclopæedia of Canadian biography being chiefly men of the time ..., GM Rose (1886)
The Canadian biographical dictionary and portrait gallery of eminent and self-made men ... (1880)

1838 births
1888 deaths
Conservative Party of Canada (1867–1942) MPs
Mayors of Belleville, Ontario
Members of the House of Commons of Canada from Ontario
Progressive Conservative Party of Ontario MPPs